Isabel Crook (born 15 December 1915) is a Chinese-born Canadian anthropologist and former professor at Beijing Foreign Studies University. She is notable for her participation in the Cultural Revolution, as well as her work as a teacher and researcher.

Early life 
Isabel Crook was born on December 15, 1915, in Chengdu, Sichuan, to Canadian missionaries Homer and Muriel Brown. Homer Brown was the Dean of the Education Faculty at West China Union University, and Muriel set up Montessori Schools in China and served on the board of the YWCA. When Crook was young, she became interested in anthropology and the many ethnic minorities in China. At the age of 23, Crook graduated from the University of Toronto and began carrying out field research in Li County, Aba Tibetan and Qiang Autonomous Prefecture, Sichuan Province.

Career, marriage, and the Cultural Revolution 
In early 1940s, she met David Crook, a committed Stalinist who had spied for the KGB in Spain and Shanghai, and married him in 1942. In 1947, Isabel and David Crook went to Ten Mile Inn, Shidong Township, Hebei Province, to observe and study the revolutionary land reform. Six months later, they accepted an invitation from CPC leaders to teach at a newly established foreign affairs school, which was the forerunner of today's Beijing Foreign Studies University (BFSU). As a teacher at BFSU Crook laid the foundation for foreign language education in China. During the Cultural Revolution, David Crook was imprisoned from 1967 to 1973 in Qincheng prison, while Isabel Crook was confined on the BFSU Campus. Despite this, Isabel Crook has stated that she understood and forgave her captors.  In June 2019, she became an honorary citizen of Bishan District,
Chongqing.

Personal life
Isabel Crook was married to David Crook, a journalist and a member of the British Communist Party. They have three sons.

Works
 Xinglong Chang: Field Notes of a Village Called Prosperity 1940-1942
 Revolution in a Chinese Village: Ten Mile Inn

Awards
On September 30, 2019, Isabel Crook was awarded the Medal of Friendship by Chinese president Xi Jinping.

References

External links
 
 A century of love for China

1915 births
Living people
Writers from Chengdu
University of Toronto alumni
Alumni of the London School of Economics
English anthropologists
British women anthropologists
Canadian anthropologists
Canadian women anthropologists
Academic staff of Beijing Foreign Studies University
Canadian centenarians
British centenarians
Women centenarians
Canadian expatriates in China
Educators from Sichuan